The Luis Aparicio Award is given annually to a Venezuelan player in Major League Baseball (MLB) who is judged to have recorded the best individual performance in that year.  The winner of the award is determined by a vote conducted by Venezuelan sports journalists and Spanish-language media around the world.  It is named after former MLB shortstop Luis Aparicio, who is the only player from Venezuela to be inducted into the National Baseball Hall of Fame.  The award was first presented in 2004, and was created in order to honour Aparicio's major league career and to commemorate his father, who died thirteen years before his son was elected into the Hall of Fame.

Johan Santana, José Altuve, and Miguel Cabrera are the only players to win the Luis Aparicio Award more than once, with Cabrera having won the award five times.  Cabrera won the MLB Most Valuable Player (MVP) Award and Hank Aaron Award alongside the Luis Aparicio Award in 2012 and 2013, becoming the first Venezuelan to win the MLB MVP Award.  Santana, the 2004 and 2006 recipient, also won the Cy Young Award in those two years, winning by a unanimous vote on each occasion.  Altuve, also a winner in 2014 and 2016, is the only player to win the Luis Aparicio Award, the MVP award, and become a World Series champion in the same season in 2017. He has also won a batting title in each of his three award seasons. Santana (2006) and Cabrera (2012) are the only award winners to also earn the pitching and batting Triple Crown respectively in the same season.  In accomplishing the feat, Cabrera became the first player in 45 years to achieve a Triple Crown in batting since Carl Yastrzemski in 1967, while Santana became the first pitcher since Dwight Gooden in 1985 to secure a "Major League Triple Crown" by leading all of MLB in wins, earned run average and strikeouts.  Francisco Rodríguez compiled a major league record of 62 saves in a single season in 2008 and went on to win the Rolaids Relief Man Award in the same year as the Luis Aparicio Award.  Four winners – Cabrera, Altuve,  Magglio Ordóñez, and Carlos González – were batting champions in their respective leagues in the same year they won the award.

The award is presented annually before a baseball game hosted by the local team, Águilas del Zulia, on November 18 in Aparicio's hometown of Maracaibo, Zulia.  The date marks both the feast of the Virgin of Chiquinquirá – the patron saint of Zulia – and the anniversary of Aparicio's professional debut.  , the most recent recipients of the award are Luis Arráez of the Minnesota Twins and José Altuve of the Houston Astros.

Winners

See also

Baseball in Venezuela

References
General

Specific

Major League Baseball trophies and awards
+
+
Venezuelan awards
Baseball in Venezuela
Awards established in 2004
2004 establishments in Venezuela